Poland competed at the 1971 European Athletics Championships in Helsinki, Finland, from 10-15 August 1971. A delegation of 65 athletes were sent to represent the country.

Medals

References

European Athletics Championships
1971
Nations at the 1971 European Athletics Championships